The Alan Thicke Show was a Canadian daytime talk show hosted by Alan Thicke. A replacement for The Alan Hamel Show, which ran from 1976 to 1980, it aired on CTV between 1980 and 1983. During its run, highlights from the week's interviews were edited together for a weekly prime-time series on CTV which aired under the titles Prime Cuts and Fast Company. Thicke left the series in order to launch a US talk show, Thicke of the Night, and was replaced by Don Harron, with the show subsequently retitled The Don Harron Show.

External links 
 

1980 Canadian television series debuts
1983 Canadian television series endings
CTV Television Network original programming
1980s Canadian variety television series
1980s Canadian television talk shows